United States v. Wilson, 32 U.S. (7 Pet.) 150 (1833), was a case in the United States in which the defendant, George Wilson, was convicted of robbing the US Mail, and putting the life of the carrier in danger, in Pennsylvania and sentenced to death. Due to his friends' influence, Wilson was pardoned by Andrew Jackson. 

The pardon included the following condition:

Wilson, however, refused the pardon. The Supreme Court was thus asked to rule on the case.

The decision was that if the prisoner does not accept the pardon, it is not in effect: "A pardon is a deed, to the validity of which delivery is essential, and delivery is not complete without acceptance. It may then be rejected by the person to whom it is tendered; and if it is rejected, we have discovered no power in this court to force it upon him."

While Wilson refused the pardon, he avoided being hanged unlike his accomplice who was. A report in The National Gazette of Philadelphia dated January 14, 1841 suggests that he was in prison for ten years until released. He received another pardon from President Martin Van Buren, which he accepted. The Smithsonian magazine has written that Wilson was hanged as a result of refusing the pardon.

References

External links
 

United States Supreme Court cases
United States Supreme Court cases of the Marshall Court
United States clemency case law
Criminal cases in the Marshall Court
Pardons
1833 in United States case law